Ophrys tumentia is a plant species in the family Orchidaceae (orchids).

References 

tumentia